The United Bible Societies (UBS) is a global fellowship of around 150 Bible Societies operating in more than 240 countries and territories. It has working hubs in England, Singapore, Nairobi and Miami. The headquarters are located in Swindon, England.

History 
The organisation was founded in 1946 by representatives from several national Bible Societies. The founding meeting took place in Elfinsward, a retreat centre in Haywards Heath, England. The Bible Societies had been in discussions about working together before the war, and their war-time experiences made them even more determined to do so. Several delegates had survived years in prisons or concentration camps.

“There is not much hope in the world but there is very much hope in the Bible,” noted Bishop Eivind Berggrav from Norway, who spent much of the war in solitary confinement. “Peace and hope are two of the chief words in the Bible, and now the world is asking how we can find our way into the new future.”

On 9 May 1946, “moved by the need of the world for the Word of God and by the deep Christian fellowship of those who work together for its spread”, the Bible Societies agreed to form United Bible Societies (UBS).

Mission 
The mission of United Bible Societies is to make the Bible available and accessible to everyone who wants it, and to help people engage with its message in meaningful and relevant ways. It has provided nearly three-quarters of the world's full Bible translations and is the world's biggest translator, publisher and distributor of the Bible.

Between 2015 and 2019, Bible Societies around the world distributed over 1.8 billion Scriptures and completed Scripture translations in 270 languages used by 1.7 billion people. Bible Societies are also active in areas such as HIV/AIDS prevention, trauma healing and literacy. Bible Societies carry out their work in partnership with all Christian Churches and many international non-governmental organisations. It has an observer status with the World Council of Churches and collaborates with the Catholic Biblical Federation as well as with several church organisations.

Paratext 
UBS developed Paratext, the most important and widely used software for Bible translation. It performs many functions unique to the Bible translation task, and to the process of translating into a language whose writing system is still being developed.  The text editor is indexed to the Biblical texts enabling powerful searching and checking from the very beginning of a translation effort.  Paratext has many other cutting-edge features including collaboration tools that allow for translators to work from many different locations.  Paratext is also integrated with the Digital Bible Library which allows for easy archiving and publishing of biblical texts.
Paratext is currently being jointly maintained and developed with SIL International.

Members 
The UBS has members and affiliates in around 150 countries, working in more than 240 countries and territories. They include, among others:
 The British and Foreign Bible Society (1804)
Scottish Bible Society (1809)
 The Bible Society of India (1811)
Netherlands Bible Society (1814)
American Bible Society (1816)
Bible Society Australia (1817)
 Bible Society NSW (1817)
 Colombian Bible Society (1825)
 Bible Society New Zealand (1846)
Canadian Bible Society / Société biblique canadienne (1904)
Deutsche Bibelgesellschaft (German Bible Society) (1981, predecessors 1812)
 Korean Bible Society (1949)
Nepal Bible Society (1 November 1975)
 Bible Society of South Africa
 Ukrainian Bible Society
 Russian Bible Society
 Japan Bible Society
 Hungarian Bible Society
 Philippine Bible Society
 Slovenian Bible Society
 Hellenic Bible Society
 Indonesian Bible Society

Magazine
The Bible Translator is a refereed journal, published since 1950, dedicated to articles about the theory and practice of Bible translation. It appears in two series – Technical Papers in January and July, and Practical Papers in April and October.

See also 

 Hebrew Old Testament Text Project

References

External links
 United Bible Societies website

Bible societies
Organisations based in Swindon
Christian organizations established in 1946
1946 establishments in England
1946 establishments in Switzerland